White Bim Black Ear (translit. Belyy Bim, Chyornoe ukho) is a 1977 Soviet drama film directed by Stanislav Rostotsky. It is based upon the book of the same name, written by Gavriil Troyepolsky and is about a white Gordon Setter with a black ear who becomes homeless because of his master's illness. The film was nominated for the Academy Award for Best Foreign Language Film at the 51st Academy Awards.

Plot
Ivan Ivanovich, an older man who is fond of reading and nature, buys a puppy despite the dog's improper coloration and black ear, which are considered faults in terms of its breed standard. The man names his dog Bim (diminutive form: Bimka), and often takes him in the country to enable the dog to track birds, as is his nature.

Ivan Ivanovich begins to develop heart problems, and when the disease becomes worse, is taken to a hospital. His dog cannot bear waiting for the only person that ever cared for him, and sets out to find his master. Thus begins the story of a stray dog and his adventures and encounters with many people, both kind and cruel. Ultimately, he is unable to find a permanent home. His owner returns home only to discover that Bim has been tricked by a perfidious neighbor and died.

Cast
 Vyacheslav Tikhonov   as Ivan Ivanovich (Master)
 Vasya Vorob'ev        as Tolik (the boy who picked up the dog)
 Irina Shevchuk        as Dasha
 Valentina Vladimirova as Sneaky Woman
 Andrey Martynov       as  driver
 Anya Rybnikova        as Lyusya (a girl)
 Yuri Grigor'ev        as  police  officer
 Two English setters as Bim

See also
 Hachikō
 List of submissions to the 51st Academy Awards for Best Foreign Language Film
 List of Soviet submissions for the Academy Award for Best Foreign Language Film

References

External links
 
 

1977 films
1977 drama films
Soviet drama films
Russian drama films
Films about dogs
Films set in Russia
Films set in the Soviet Union
Films shot in Russia
Gorky Film Studio films
1970s Russian-language films
Films directed by Stanislav Rostotsky
Films scored by Andrey Petrov
Crystal Globe winners